Boss of Lonely Valley is a 1937 American Western film directed by Ray Taylor and written by Frances Guihan. The film stars Buck Jones, Richard Holland, Muriel Evans, Harvey Clark, Walter Miller and Lee Phelps. The film was released on December 1, 1937, by Universal Pictures.

Plot

Cast       
Buck Jones as Steve Hanson
Richard Holland as Sonny Lowery 
Muriel Evans as Retta Lowrey
Harvey Clark as Jim Lynch
Walter Miller as Jake Wagner
Lee Phelps as Peter Starr
Matty Fain as Sam Leavitt
Grace Goodall as Aunt Martha Wiggins
Ezra Paulette as Suds Maloney
Virginia Dabney as Blondie
Ted Adams as Henchman Slim
Joe Bishop as Singing Cowhand
Silver as Silver

References

External links
 

1937 films
American Western (genre) films
1937 Western (genre) films
Universal Pictures films
Films directed by Ray Taylor
American black-and-white films
1930s English-language films
1930s American films